"Automatic" is the first single from The Get Up Kids' album There Are Rules. After the band's breakup in 2005, "Automatic" was the first single released by the band since their reformation in 2008.

Track listing

Release 
"Automatic" was released in the fall of 2011 on 7" Vinyl. It was the band's first release on their own Quality Hill Recordings label, and marked the band's departure from long-time partners Vagrant Records.

A Music video for the song was released on February 17, 2011.

Personnel 
Matt Pryor - Vocals, guitar
Jim Suptic - Guitar, Backing vocals
Rob Pope - Bass
Ryan Pope - Drums
James Dewees - Keyboard
Ed Rose - Producer

Notes

2011 singles
The Get Up Kids songs
2011 songs